The Genealogical Proof Standard (GPS) is a guideline for establishing the reliability ("proof") of a genealogical conclusion with reasonable certainty. It is important within the genealogical community for clearly communicating the quality of research performed, such as by a professional genealogist.  It is also useful for helping new genealogists understand what is needed to do high-quality research.

It has five elements:
 reasonably exhaustive research;
 complete and accurate source citations;
 analysis and correlation of the collected information;
 resolution of any conflicting evidence; and
 a soundly reasoned, coherently written conclusion.

References

External links
 
 
 

Standards
Genealogy